The Gulf Coast Flash were a franchise of the American Basketball Association based in Gulfport, Mississippi that debuted in the 2010-2011 season. It was purchased by Jeremi Washington in June 2010. The team played in the Gulf Coast Division and its home games on the campus of Gulfport High School.

In its first season, the Flash made it to the ABA Finals where they would become runners-up.

Season-by-season record

External links
Gulf Coast Flash Official Website

Defunct American Basketball Association (2000–present) teams
Basketball teams in Mississippi
Basketball teams established in 2010
2010 establishments in Mississippi